Lieutenant General Nils Gustaf Axel Welin (12 July 1930 – 11 November 2008) was a senior Swedish Army officer. Welin served as head of the Swedish National Defence College (1984–1987), as Force Commander of the United Nations Disengagement Observer Force (UNDOF) (1986–1988) and as Commanding General of the Southern Military District (1988–1992).

Early life
Welin was born on 12 July 1930 in Gothenburg Vasa Parish (Göteborgs Vasa församling), Gothenburg and Bohus County, Sweden the son of colonel Axel Welin and his wife Märta (née Löfgren). His father was born in Stockholm and participated in the Winter War as chief engineer in the Swedish Volunteer Corps. He later became commander of the Svea Engineer Corps/Regiment (1953–1959) in Stockholm, and his mother was a board member of the Right-Wing Party's and later the Moderate Party's women's association in Engelbrekt Parish, as well as served for many years as a juror in the Stockholm District Court. His sister Birgitta was a librarian in Vaxholm and was married to the Justice of the Supreme Court of Sweden . After Welin's family moved to Stockholm, he passed studentexamen at Norra Real in 1949.

Career
Welin was commissioned as an officer in 1952 and was assigned as a second lieutenant to the Svea Life Guards. He attended the Swedish Armed Forces Staff College from 1960 to 1962, served as captain in the Defence Staff in 1964 and in Västerbotten Regiment in 1967. He then served as company commander with the United Nations in Cyprus, part of the United Nations Peacekeeping Force in Cyprus (UNFICYP) from 1967 to 1968. Welin attended the Swedish Armed Forces Staff College in 1968 and was promoted to major. He served as lieutenant colonel in the Defence Staff in 1971 and at the Ministry of Defence from 1972 to 1973. Welin served in Hälsinge Regiment in 1974, was promoted to colonel in 1975 and served at the Swedish Armed Forces Staff College the same year, and attended the Swedish National Defence College in 1976.

From 1 October 19777, Welin served as deputy commander of Värmland Regiment in Karlstad. Welin was appointed chief of staff of the Western Military District in Skövde from 1 April 1979 and was appointed senior colonel in the General Staff Corps. On 1 October 1980, he was appointed chief of staff of the Eastern Military District in Strängnäs and was appointed major general at the same time. In 1981, Welin attended a staff school in United States. On 1 April 1984, Welin assumed the position of head of the Swedish National Defence College.

On 1 July 1986, he succeeded major general Gustav Hägglund as Force Commander of the United Nations Disengagement Observer Force (UNDOF) on the Golan Heights in Israel, with headquarters in Damascus, Syria. He served in this position until September 1988. On 1 October 1988, Welin was promoted to lieutenant general and appointed Commanding General of the Southern Military District in Kristianstad. He served in this position until 1992 when he retired from active service. Welin was then head of the Office of the Minister of Defence in the Ministry of Defence from 1993 to 1994. As appointed by Minister of Defence Anders Björck, Welin did a solo investigation into where the UN school and a possible international disaster and aid center should be located; Karlsborg or Södertälje.

Welin took an active part in the defence debate with articles in the daily press and he was a commentator in Radio/TV between 1968 and 1973. Welin was also a board member of the Swedish Fencing Federation (Svenska Fäktförbundet) from 1974 to 1982 and chairman of the Sveagardesföreningen from 1993 to 2000 and in the association De Femton. Welin became a member of the Royal Swedish Academy of War Sciences in 1973 and served as chairman of Departmen I from 1996 to 2000 and was vice president from 2002 to 2006.

Personal life
Welin got engage to Coco Selfelt in March 1954. The banns of marriage were issued on 10 October 1954 and on 5 November 1954 in Gustaf Adolf Church, Stockholm, Welin married Lillemor Gunvor Elisabet (Coco) Selfelt (1931–1997), the daughter of lieutenant colonel Robert Selfelt and Gunvor (née Lindeman). They had two children: Anders (born 31 May 1957 at Allmänna BB, Stockholm), and Elisabeth (born 14 May 1960 at Allmänna BB, Stockholm).

Death
Welin, who suffered from COPD, died on 11 November 2008 in Engelbrekt Parish, Stockholm. The funeral took place in the Gustaf Adolf Church on 18 December 2008. He was interred on 15 June 2009 at Solna Cemetery.

Dates of rank
1952 – Second lieutenant
19?? – Lieutenant
1964 – Captain
1968 – Major
1971 – Lieutenant colonel
1975 – Colonel
1 April 1979 – Senior colonel
1 October 1980 – Major general
1 October 1988 – Lieutenant general

Awards and decorations
   Knight of the Order of the Sword (6 June 1970)
   United Nations Medal (UNFICYP) (1968)
   United Nations Medal (UNDOF) (1988)

Honours
Member of the Royal Swedish Academy of War Sciences (1973)

Bibliography

References

1930 births
2008 deaths
Swedish Army lieutenant generals
United Nations military personnel
Members of the Royal Swedish Academy of War Sciences
Military personnel from Gothenburg
Knights of the Order of the Sword